Ziviyeh District is a district (bakhsh) in Saqqez County, Kurdistan Province, Iran. At the 2006 census, its population was 30,912, in 6,230 families.  The District has one city: Saheb. The District has two rural districts (dehestan): Gol Tappeh Rural District and Saheb Rural District.

References

See also
Ziwiyeh castle
Ziwiye hoard

Saqqez County
Districts of Kurdistan Province